Orchamps is a neighbourhood in the south-east of the city of Besançon, France. Like nearby Clairs-Soleils and Planoise, to the west of the city, Orchamps was built in the late 1960s. It is situated close to Bregille.

For education, the neighbourhood is served by the Édouard Herriot public kindergarten and the Édouard Herriot public primary school. For transport, it is served by bus routes 1, 2, 3, 5, 6, 22, 32, 35, 71, 72, 73, 74 and 75.

Areas of Besançon